Alphaea dellabrunai is a moth of the family Erebidae. It was described by Saldaitis and Ivinskis in 2008. It is found in Yunnan, China.

References

Moths described in 2008
Spilosomina
Moths of Asia